Poplar River is a tributary of the Missouri River, approximately  long in Saskatchewan in Canada and Montana in the United States. The river is composed of three main forks – West, Middle, and East Polar Rivers – that have their source in the Wood Mountain Hills of the Missouri Coteau.

Along with the Milk River and Big Muddy Creek, it is one of three waterways in Canada that drain into the Gulf of Mexico.

Description 
Poplar River and its main forks of West, Middle, and East Poplar Rivers begin in the Wood Mountain Hills in Saskatchewan. West Poplar River rises near Killdeer, Saskatchewan and flows south-east, into north-eastern Montana, past Richland and across Daniels County. Poplar River (Middle fork) rises north-west of Rockglen, Saskatchewan and flows south-east, into north-eastern Montana, and passes west of Scobey. The two forks unite in the northern part of Fort Peck Indian Reservation. The combined river flows south-east, then south-southwest, and joins the Missouri River near Poplar.

The East Poplar River begins south of Willow Bunch, Saskatchewan and flows south out of the hills and meets the Poplar River in Montana upstream from where the West Poplar River meets it. Along the course of the East Poplar River, on the Canadian side of the border, is Poplar River Power Station, which is a coal fired station owned by SaskPower. Morrison Dam was built along the river in 1977 to provide cooling water for the station. Girard Creek, which originates at Fife Lake, and East Poplar River are the primary inflows for the Morrison Dam Reservoir.

Variant names 
The Poplar River has also been known as: Lost Child Creek and Middle Fork Poplar River.

See also 

List of rivers of Saskatchewan
List of rivers of Montana
List of tributaries of the Missouri River

References

External links 

Rivers of Montana
Rivers of Saskatchewan
Tributaries of the Missouri River
International rivers of North America
Bodies of water of Roosevelt County, Montana
Bodies of water of Daniels County, Montana